Uroš Poljanec (born 23 August 1991) is a Slovenian professional footballer who plays as a goalkeeper. Besides Slovenia, he has played in Austria, Mongolia, Iceland, Cyprus, Romania, and India.

Club career

In 2015, Poljanec was noticed by an agent who was pursuing players to sign for Mongolian championship contenders Khoromkhon. As the club were in clamant need of a goalkeeper, the agent offered him a contract, which he accepted, becoming the first Slovenian to play in Mongolia as a result. Poljanec helped his team to four victories, two draws and two defeats in eight rounds during his stay there. Poljanec also made two appearances in the 2016 AFC Cup qualifying round in a 1–0 loss to K-Electric and a goalless draw with Druk United through August 2015.

In 2016, he signed for Fjarðabyggðar.

In November 2017, Poljanec signed for the I-League club Chennai City. He played 13 matches for the Chennai-based side and had 5 clean sheets.

In 2018, he signed for Fužinar.

In 2020, he signed for Ypsonas FC.

In 2021, he signed for Međimurje.

In 2022, he signed for Foresta Suceava. After that, he signed for Vinodol.

References

External links

 UROS POLJANEC Στατιστικά 2020 - 2021

1991 births
Living people
Slovenian footballers
Association football goalkeepers
Slovenian expatriate footballers
Expatriate footballers in Austria
Expatriate footballers in Mongolia
Expatriate footballers in Iceland
Expatriate footballers in India
Expatriate footballers in Cyprus
Expatriate footballers in Croatia
Úrvalsdeild karla (football) players
Slovenia youth international footballers
NK Aluminij players
Khoromkhon players
Slovenian expatriate sportspeople in Austria
Slovenian expatriate sportspeople in Cyprus
Chennai City FC players
NK Fužinar players
NK Međimurje players
NK Drava Ptuj (2004) players
Slovenian Second League players
I-League players
Cypriot Second Division players
First Football League (Croatia) players
ACS Foresta Suceava players
Liga III players
Slovenian expatriate sportspeople in India
Slovenian expatriate sportspeople in Iceland
Slovenian expatriate sportspeople in Romania
Sportspeople from Maribor